Khushalpur is a town  in Hathras district of Uttar Pradesh State, India. The City is administrated by Chairman an elected representative of the City.

Demography 
, The town has a total number of 505 houses and the population of 1,987 of which include 988 are males while 969 are females.  According to the report published by Census India in 2011, out of the total population of the town 1987 people are from Caste Baghel and the village does not have any Schedule Tribe population so far.1987

See also
List of Town in Uttar Pradesh

References

External links 
 Pradesh tourism.gov.in/ Tourism of Uttar Pradesh
 Pradesh census.gov.in/ Census of Uttar Pradesh

Cities and towns in Hathras district